The Samsung Galaxy Tab S7, Galaxy Tab S7+ (Galaxy Tab S7 Plus) and Galaxy Tab S7 FE (Also known as Galaxy Tab S7 Lite, Galaxy Tab S7 Fan Edition) are Android-based tablets designed, developed, and marketed by Samsung Electronics. The Tab S7 and Tab S7+ were announced on August 5, 2020 during Samsung's virtual Unpacked event, while the Tab S7 Fan Edition was announced later on May 25, 2021.

Design 
The Galaxy Tab S7 and Tab S7+ maintain a similar design from its predecessor. However, the screen sizes were enlarged, with the 11-inch model replacing the 10.5 inch, and a new 12.4-inch model was introduced. The tablets also come in four new colors, Mystic Black, Mystic Silver, Mystic Bronze and Mystic Navy.

Specifications

Hardware

Display 
The Galaxy Tab S7 features an 11-inch 2560 x 1600 LCD display, while the Tab S7+ features a 12.4-inch 2800 x 1752 OLED display. Both models have a 120Hz refresh rate.

Chipset 
Both tablets feature a Qualcomm Snapdragon 865+ system on a chip. The SoC is based on the 7 nm+ processing technology node. The tablets also feature an Adreno 650 GPU.

Storage 
The Galaxy Tab S7 and Tab S7+ are available in 128, 256, and 512 GB options, though in some regions, not all capacity variants are available.
1 TB of expansion can be added using a microSD card.
The base amount of RAM is 6 GB, and is upgradeable to 8 GB.

Battery 
The Galaxy Tab S7 and Tab S7+ both use non-removable Li-Ion batteries, rated at 8,000 mAh and 10,090 mAh respectively. It is also capable of 45W fast charging.

Connectivity 
Both tablets come with 5G standard connectivity, though some regions may have LTE or sub-6GHz only variants. There is also a Wi-Fi only variant.

Cameras 
Both tablets feature a dual rear camera array. The wide-angle lens is 26mm 13 MP camera with an ƒ/2.0 aperture, while the ultra-wide lens is a 12mm 5 MP with an ƒ/2.2 aperture.

S-Pen 
Similar to the Samsung Galaxy Note 20, the Galaxy Tab S7 and S7+ feature better latency at 9ms. It also gains the new Air gestures.

Software 
The Galaxy Tab S7 and S7+ ship with Android 10 with One UI 2. It also supports Samsung DeX.

Gallery

References 

Samsung Galaxy Tab series
Android (operating system) devices
Galaxy Tab
Tab
Tablet computers
Tablet computers introduced in 2020